The Kleinsee is a lake in the municipality of Sankt Kanzian in Carinthia, Austria.

The maximum depth of the Kleinsee is 15 meters, while its average depth is 10 meters. The larger Lake Klopein lies a little way east, separated by the village of Seelach.

External links 
 Kleinsee bei Klopein (German)
 About Kleinsee (German)

Lakes of Carinthia (state)